The University of South Carolina School of Law, also known as South Carolina Law School, is a professional school within the University of South Carolina. The school of law was founded in 1867, and remains the only public and non-profit law school in the state of South Carolina. The school has been accredited by the American Bar Association since 1925 and has been a member of the Association of American Law Schools since 1924.

The entering class of first-year law students in 2019 was composed of 212 students from 22 states. Fifty-two percent of students were from South Carolina, and minority students made up twenty percent of the class. Forty-six percent of incoming students were female, while Fifty-four percent were male. In the 2023 edition of U.S. News & World Report's "Best Law Schools," the South Carolina School of Law ranked #84.

History

The discussion of starting a law program began as early as 1810 when President Jonathan Maxcy recommended to the board of trustees of South Carolina College that the school establish a professorship of the law.  A resolution of the statehouse in 1823 requested the college to consider "the propriety and advantage of establishing a Professorship of Law in that institution, and to report to this house, at the next session, the manner in which such a Professorship may be established, so as to be most advantageous to the community, and least expensive to the State."  The trustees replied that a professor should be hired, but that the courses should be offered only to graduates.  With that, the matter ended.

When the modern University of South Carolina was formed from South Carolina College in December 1865, the act doing so also authorized the trustees to hire one or more persons to form classes to instruct on the law under such terms as the trustees should decide.  In 1866, the act was amended to require the trustees to do so on the quickest possible terms.

In January 1867, the trustees offered Chancellor J.A. Inglis the position, but he declined.  In 1868, the offer was next made to Col. A.C. Haskell who accepted and held the post until August 1868.  The course of study included the various branches of common law and equity, commercial, international, and constitutional law.  Although the program was meant to cover two years, many students completed it in one.  A moot court was also overseen by the professor to train students in the details of actual practice.  Four students started in the program, and two graduated in June 1868.

The program lapsed during the 1868–1869 academic year, but resumed the following term under the direction of the Hon. C.D. Melton.  The program continued until it was shuttered following the death of a subsequent professor, Chief Justice Franklin J. Moses, in 1877.

During the Reconstruction Era (1868-1876), the law school graduated thirty-nine students. Eleven of these graduates were African-American.

The school resumed in 1884 under Col. Joseph Daniel Pope with a two-year program that again was often completed in one.  Professor Pope was given a small salary and the fees generated from tuition.  Special provision was made for the teaching of short courses by leading members of the bar.  The school also added minimum entrance standards at that time: An applicant had to be at least nineteen years old, have a good English education, and known enough Latin to readily understand legal terms and maxims.  Juniors were instructed in the following subjects: "Organization and Jurisdiction of Courts of United States (Supreme, Circuit, and District Courts) and South Carolina (Supreme, Common Pleas, Sessions, Probate, and Trial Justice Courts); Sources of Municipal Law; Domestic Relations; Personal Property, and title to same; Administration, Wills, Contracts, Bailments, Bills and Notes, Principal and Agent, Corporations; Criminal Law, and herein of Torts and nuisances; Public and Private Law, Law of Evidence."  Seniors were instructed in the following: "Pleadings and Practice; Law of Real Property; Equity Jurisprudence; Law of Conveyancing; Trial of Title to Land; Maritime Law and Law of Nations; State of Law of the State on subjects not read with the text and lectures of the course; Deeds, Recording, Habeas Corpus, etc."  In addition, the juniors were required to write essays, while seniors were trained in court details in a moot court.

In 1918, Claudia James Sullivan became the first female graduate of the law school. During the 1920s, the school continued to modernize under the American Bar Association's guidelines for law schools. In 1964, the school of law is Integrated and in 1967 Jasper Cureton became the first African-American graduate of the law school since Reconstruction.

Facilities 
From its opening in 1867 until 1875, the law school held classes in what now are the South Caroliniana Library and DeSaussure College. In 1891, the Law Department was moved to Legare College. From 1919 to 1950, the law school was located in Petigru College (in 1950, renamed to Currell College). From 1950 to 1974, the law school was located in the new Petigru College. From 1974 to 2017, the law school was located in the University of South Carolina Law Center at 701 Main Street.

On July 27, 2011, the law school officially announced plans for a new building, to be located on a block between Senate, Gervais, Bull and Pickens streets in downtown Columbia.  In February 2013, the university's board of trustees voted to pay more than half of the $80 million cost of the 187,500 square foot building with bonds backed by students' tuition payments. The new state-of-the-art building opened in June 2017, with space to accommodate over 660 students with instructional spaces including 17 classrooms ranging from 20 to 95 seats, a ceremonial courtroom, and law library. It also houses faculty areas, legal clinics, and student journals and organization spaces. Featuring the Karen J. Williams Courtroom, named for a late USC law school alumna who became the first female chief judge at the Fourth Circuit Court of Appeals, the 300-seat ceremonial courtroom periodically hosts U.S. Court of Appeals sessions and also serve as an auditorium as well as large classroom. The school's law library houses over 500,000 volumes or volume equivalents, making it the largest law library in the state.

Centers and Programs 
Centers and programs help to advance the academic, research, and service mission of the South Carolina School of Law.

 Children's Law Center
 Cybersecurity Legal Task Force
 Nelson Mullins Riley & Scarborough Center on Professionalism
 South Carolina Rule of Law Collaborative
 South Carolina Pro Bono Program

Clinics 
Clinics allow second-semester second-year students and third-year students at South Carolina Law to learn the law and the standards of the legal profession by representing actual clients.

 Carolina Health Advocacy Medicolegal Partnership (CHAMPS) Clinic
 Criminal Practice Clinic
 Domestic Violence Clinic
 Educational Rights Clinic
 Environmental Law Clinic
 Juvenile Justice Clinic
 Nonprofit Organizations Clinic
 Veterans Legal Clinic

Law Journals 
The South Carolina School of Law houses four student-edited law journals. The oldest, the South Carolina Law Review was founded in 1937, but traces its roots to the 1831 Carolina Bar Journal.

 Journal of Law & Education (JLED)
 Real Property, Trust & Estate Law Journal, published with the Real Property, Trust and Estate Law Section of the American Bar Association
 South Carolina Journal of International Law & Business
 South Carolina Law Review

Employment 
According to South Carolina School of Law 2018 ABA-required disclosures, 84.8% of the Class of 2018 obtained full-time, long-term, JD-required or JD advantage employment 10 months after graduation.

Costs
The total cost of attendance (indicating the cost of tuition, fees, and living expenses) at South Carolina for the 2013–2014 academic year for a non-resident is $62,440, and for a resident is $40,048. The Law School Transparency estimated debt-financed cost of attendance for three years for a non-resident is $240,274, and for a resident is $151,733.

Notable alumni

Political
J. Christian Adams - Commissioner, United States Commission on Civil Rights 
David Beasley - Former Governor of South Carolina and executive director of the U.N. World Food Programme
Stephen K. Benjamin - Senior Advisor to President Joe Biden and former Mayor of Columbia, South Carolina
Trey Gowdy - Former U.S. Representative for South Carolina's 4th congressional district
Lindsey Graham - United States Senator for South Carolina
Van Hipp Jr. - Former South Carolina Republican Party Chairman and Former Deputy Assistant Secretary of the US Army
Jim Hodges - Former Governor of South Carolina
Fritz Hollings - Former United States Senator
Styles Linton Hutchins, legislator in Texas
James H. "Jay" Lucas - Speaker of the South Carolina House of Representatives
Glenn F. McConnell - Former Lieutenant Governor of South Carolina and Former President of the College of Charleston
Edgar L. McGowan - Former Commissioner of Labor of South Carolina
Henry McMaster - 117th Governor of South Carolina
Robert Evander McNair - Former Governor of South Carolina
Tom Rice - U.S. Representative for South Carolina's 7th Congressional district
Floyd Spence - Former U.S. Representative for South Carolina's 2nd congressional district
William Timmons - U.S. Representative for South Carolina's 4th congressional district
Alan Wilson - Attorney General of South Carolina
Joe Wilson - U.S. Representative for South Carolina's 2nd congressional district

Judicial
Joseph F. Anderson - Senior District Judge for the U.S. District Court of South Carolina
Donald W. Beatty - Chief Justice of the South Carolina Supreme Court
William Byrd Traxler Jr. - Judge for the U.S. Court of Appeals for the Fourth Circuit
Timothy M. Cain - District Judge for the U.S. District Court of South Carolina
J. Michelle Childs - District Judge for the U.S. District Court of South Carolina
Patrick Michael Duffy - Senior District Judge for the U.S. District Court of South Carolina
John Cannon Few - Associate Justice of the South Carolina Supreme Court
Henry F. Floyd - Judge for the U.S. Court of Appeals for the Fourth Circuit
Robert Bryan Harwell - District Judge for the U.S. District Court of South Carolina
Kaye Gorenflo Hearn - Former Associate Justice of the South Carolina Supreme Court
Bruce Howe Hendricks - District Judge for the U.S. District Court of South Carolina
Henry Michael Herlong, Jr. - Senior District Judge for the U.S. District Court of South Carolina
D. Garrison Hill -  Associate Justice of the South Carolina Supreme Court
Charles Weston Houck - Senior District Judge for the U.S. District Court of South Carolina
David C. Norton - District Judge for the U.S. District Court of South Carolina
George C. James - Associate Justice of the South Carolina Supreme Court
John W. Kittredge - Associate Justice of the South Carolina Supreme Court
Mary Geiger Lewis - District Judge for the U.S. District Court of South Carolina
Costa M. Pleicones - Former Chief Justice of the South Carolina Supreme Court
Dennis Shedd - Judge for the U.S. Court of Appeals for the Fourth Circuit
Jean Hoefer Toal - Former Chief Justice of the South Carolina Supreme Court
A. Marvin Quattlebaum Jr. — Judge for the U.S. Court of Appeals for the Fourth Circuit
Terry L. Wooten - Chief District Judge for the U.S. District Court of South Carolina

Individuals
David Bruck - Noted capital defense attorney and Supreme Court advocate
Judy Clarke - Noted criminal defense attorney for Ted Kaczynski, Zacarias Moussaoui, Susan Smith, Eric Rudolph, Jared Lee Loughner, and Dzhokhar Tsarnaev
Terrell L. Glenn Sr. - U.S. Attorney for South Carolina under John F. Kennedy and Lyndon B. Johnson
 Alex Murdaugh, subject of a high-profile murder case in South Carolina, see Trial of Alex Murdaugh
Melvin Purvis - American law enforcement official and Federal Bureau of Investigation (FBI) agent
Bakari Sellers - Attorney, political commentator, and politician who served in the South Carolina House of Representatives

Admissions

South Carolina bar exam passage 
In South Carolina, the bar exam is administered twice a year—in July and February. July is the primary testing date for those who graduate in May. A much smaller group, generally out-of-state applicants, repeat takers, and December graduates, take the February exam. The South Carolina Supreme Court did not release the pass rate for specific schools' alumni until the July 2007 exam when the court separately listed the pass rate for the University of South Carolina and the Charleston School of Law.

* The July 2007 results were revised upwards after the South Carolina Supreme Court threw out a section of the exam because of an error by a bar examiner.

References

Sources
Edwin L. Green, A History of the University of South Carolina 236-40 (1916) (on the history of the law school).

External links 
The University South Carolina School of Law

Educational institutions established in 1867
Law schools in South Carolina
Law
Education in Columbia, South Carolina
Buildings and structures in Columbia, South Carolina
1887 establishments in South Carolina